Sara Lipton is a medieval historian; she is a professor of history at Stony Brook University.

Lipton is noted for her work on the medieval origins of the iconography of antisemitism.  According to Howard Jacobson, Lipton argues that the medieval artistic convention of depicting Jews with a Roman nose, dark skin, and scraggly or pointy beard originated in the 1200s, and were commissioned by Christian authorities as works of art depicting the sinfulness of greed in order to set the pious on a righteous (non-greedy) path to heaven.  Jacobson notes that even if the Church's motivation was to discourage sin rather than to promote Jew-hatred, it was "a hard distinction to maintain."

Dark Mirror
Dark Mirror: The Medieval Origins of Anti-Jewish Iconography (2014) traces the development of antisemitic imagery from the 1000s through the 1400s.

References

Living people
American medievalists
Scholars of antisemitism
Women medievalists
American women historians
21st-century American historians
21st-century American women writers
Stony Brook University faculty
Year of birth missing (living people)